Elina Fuhrman is a Russian–American journalist, author, and wellness activist. She is the founder and CEO of Soupelina, a vegan soup company and a chef with the company.

Early and personal life
Fuhrman, originally Elina Kozmits, was born in the Moldavian SSR of the former Soviet Union and emigrated to the United States from Moscow in 1989 and became a naturalized U.S. citizen. Her mother, Rita Kozmits, later immigrated as well. Her family is Jewish.

Fuhrman is divorced from Nick Fuhrman, a Madison congressional candidate, whom she married in May 1991.  She has two children with Nick Fuhrman- actress Isabelle Fuhrman, born February 25, 1997, and singer Madeline Fuhrman, born August 21, 1993. She and her family moved to Atlanta in 1999 when she joined CNN. Fuhrman later moved to Los Angeles, where she currently resides with her family.

Fuhrman received a degree in journalism from the University of Wisconsin, Madison and studied English and Linguistics at Moscow State Pedagogical University.

Career
Fuhrman has been a writer, producer, and correspondent for CNN International and has received awards for her coverage of the war in Afghanistan and the September 11th terrorist attacks in New York City, Washington, D.C. and near Shanksville, Pennsylvania. She has covered world events such as the conflict in the Middle East, the trial of former Yugoslav leader Slobodan Milošević, the wars in Iraq and Chechnya, and interviewed numerous leaders, decision-makers and celebrities. Her work has appeared on CNN, NPR, and in The New York Times, The Atlanta Journal-Constitution, InStyle, Conde Nast Traveler, SELF, Jezebel magazines and more.

Fuhrman has also produced three documentary films on teenage issues.

Soupelina
In 2013, Fuhrman founded Soupelina, a vegan soup company. On February 2, 2016, Fuhrman published her first book, Soupelina's Soup Cleanse, which was featured in The New York Times during the week of release, and appeared on Amazon's Best of the Month and as #1 release in Soups. Soupelina's Soup Cleanse was also featured in InStyle, Harper's Bazaar, and many other publications. Soupelina soups have been featured on ABC Good Morning America and on Hallmark's The Home and Family Show.

Awards 

During her years at CNN, Fuhrman was recognised with a number of awards. She received the National Academy of Television Arts & Sciences Award for a series of stories which were produced immediately following the September 11 attacks. She received a second National Academy of Television Arts & Sciences Award for reporting on the Afghanistan war.

Fuhrman also received a nomination for the International Health & Medical Media Awards, also known as the Freddie Awards, for producing a report on autism.

Fuhrman was a 2000 Arthur F. Burns fellow, awarded to outstanding media professionals from the US and Germany who reported from each other's countries.

References

External links 
 

1969 births
American broadcast news analysts
Soviet emigrants to the United States
American people of Moldovan-Jewish descent
American people of Russian-Jewish descent
American reporters and correspondents
Living people
Russian journalists
University of Wisconsin–Madison School of Journalism & Mass Communication alumni
American chefs
American women chefs
American women television journalists
Jewish American journalists
Naturalized citizens of the United States
21st-century American Jews
21st-century American women